James Preston Waters III (born 1967) is a United States Navy rear admiral who has served as the Director of Military Personnel Plans and Policy of the U.S. Navy since April 5, 2021. Previously, he served as the Commander of Submarine Group 2 from September 30, 2019 until March 26, 2021.

Raised in Ellington, Connecticut, Waters earned a B.S. degree in systems engineering from the United States Naval Academy in 1989. Awarded a W.H.G. FitzGerald Scholarship, he continued his education at Oxford University until 1991.

References

External links

1967 births
Living people
Place of birth missing (living people)
People from Ellington, Connecticut
United States Naval Academy alumni
Alumni of the University of Oxford
United States submarine commanders
Recipients of the Meritorious Service Medal (United States)
Recipients of the Legion of Merit
United States Navy admirals
Recipients of the Defense Superior Service Medal